The Nari Shakti Puraskar is an annual award given by the Ministry of Women and Child Development of the Government of India to individual women or to institutions that work towards the cause of women empowerment. It is the highest civilian honour for women in India, and is presented by the president of India on International Women's Day (8 March) at Rashtrapati Bhavan in New Delhi. The award was instituted in 1999 under the title of Stree Shakti Puraskar, renamed and reorganised in 2015. It is awarded in six institutional and two individual categories, which carry a cash prize of 200,000 and 100,000 rupees, respectively.

Categories

The Nari Shakti Puraskar is given in six institutional categories and two categories for individual women.

Institutional categories

Each of the six institutional categories is named after an eminent woman in Indian history.

 Devi Ahilya Bai Holkar Award for best private sector organization or public sector undertaking in promoting the well-being and welfare of women. Named after Ahilyabai Holkar, an 18th-century ruler of the Malwa kingdom.
 Kannagi Devi Award for best state which has appreciably improved Child Sex Ratio (CSR). Named after Kannagi, the central character of the Tamil epic Silapathikaram.
 Mata Jijabai Award for best urban local body for providing services and facilities to women. Named after Mata Jijabai, mother of Shivaji, who founded the Maratha Empire in the 17th century.
 Rani Gaidinliu Zeliang Award given to a civil society organisation (CSO) doing outstanding work for the welfare and well-being of women. Named after Rani Gaidinliu, a 20th-century Naga spiritual and political leader
 Rani Lakshmi Bai Award given to the best institution for research and development in the field of women empowerment. Named after Lakshmibai, one of the leading figures of the Indian Rebellion of 1857 and a queen of Jhansi.
 Rani Rudramma Devi Awards given to two District Panchayats and two Gram Panchayats for work in the area of women welfare especially  related to the Beti Bachao, Beti Padhao Yojana. Named after Rudrama Devi, a 13th-century ruler of Deccan Plateau.

Individual categories
 Award for courage and bravery
 Awards for making outstanding contributions to women’s endeavour, community work, or making a difference, or women's empowerment

History 
Stree Shakti Puraskar, the predecessor of the Nari Shakti Puraskar, was instituted in the year 1999. It carried a cash prize of 100,000 and a citation. The Stree Shakti Puraskar was given in the same six categories as the Nari Shakti Award.

1999 recipients 
The first Stree Shakti Puraskar awards were conferred on five women by Prime Minister Atal Bihari Vajpayee at the Vigyan Bhavan in New Delhi on 4 January 2001:
Kannagi Stree Shakti Puraskar awarded to K. V. Rabiya of Malappuram district, Kerala for her efforts to promote the education of children with physical and/or mental disabilities
Mata Jijabai Stree Shakti Puraskar awarded to Chinna Pillai of Madurai, Tamil Nadu for her efforts towards initiating and spreading the microcredit movement and changing the lives of women living in poverty.
Devi Ahilyabai Holkar Stree Shakti Puraskar awarded to Brahmacharini Kamala Bai of Nagaur district, Rajasthan for establishing schools for girls
Jhansi Ki Rani Laxmibai Stree Shakti Puraskar awarded to Kinkri Devi of Sirmaur district, Himachal Pradesh for leading public opposition to illegal mining
Rani Gaidinliu Stree Shakti Puraskar awarded to Kumari Lalita Pradkar of Dhar district, Madhya Pradesh

2001 recipients
Five women were awarded the 2001 Stree Shakti Puraskar on 26 March 2003:

 Kannagi Stree Shakti Puraskar awarded to Satya Rani Chadha
 Mata Jijabai Stree Shakti Puraskar awarded to Mukta P. Dagli
 Devi Ahilyabai Holkar Stree Shakti Puraskar awarded to Thamma Pawar
 Jhansi Ki Rani Laxmibai Stree Shakti Puraskar awarded to Mah-Naaz Warsi
 Rani Gaidinliu Stree Shakti Puraskar awarded to Sumani Jhodia

2002 recipients 
The recipients of the 2002 Stree Shakti Puraskar were announced on 19 November 2006 together with the 2003 recipients.

 Kannagi Award to Mahjabi Sarbar
 Mata Jijabai Award to Sunita Yadav,
 Devi Ahilya Bai Holkar Award to Shanta Trivedi
 Jhansi Ki Rani Lakshmi Bai Award to Yamuna Sarojini Devi
 Rani Gaidinliu Zeliang Award to Auda Viegas

2003 recipients 
The recipients of the 2003 Stree Shakti Puraskar were announced on 19 November 2006 together with the 2002 recipients.

 Kannagi Award to Vandana Gopikumar
 Mata Jijabai Award to Kamala Khora
 Devi Ahilya Bai Holkar Award to Sunita Krishnan
 Jhansi Ki Rani Lakshmi Bai Award to Gopa Kothari
 Rani Gaidinliu Zeliang Award to Bhagirathi Dutta

2004 recipients 
The recipients of the 2004 Stree Shakti Puraskar were announced on 8 March 2008 together with the recipients for 2005 and 2006.

 Kannagi Award to Pinki Virani, Delhi
 Mata Jijabai Award to Shamshad Begum, Chhattisgarh
 Devi Ahilya Bai Holkar Award to Kavita Srivastava, Rajasthan
 Jhansi Ki Rani Lakshmi Bai Award to Triveni Balkrishna Acharya, Maharashtra
 Rani Gaidinliu Zeliang Award to Monmohani Debnath, Tripura

2005 recipients 
The recipients of the 2005 Stree Shakti Puraskar were announced on 8 March 2008 together with the recipients for 2004 and 2006.

 Kannagi Award to Shaik Shamshad Begum, Andhra Pradesh
 Mata Jijabai Award to Sandhya Raman, Delhi
 Devi Ahilya Bai Holkar Award to Neeta Bahadur, Uttar Pradesh
 Jhansi Ki Rani Lakshmi Bai Award to Rani Bang, Maharashtra
 Rani Gaidinliu Zeliang Award to Salmin Lyngdoh, Meghalaya

2006 recipients 
The recipients of the 2006 Stree Shakti Puraskar were announced on 8 March 2008 together with the recipients for 2004 and 2005.

 Kannagi Award to Kalpana Sarkar, Madhya Pradesh
 Mata Jijabai Award to Nighat Shafi Pandit, Jammu and Kashmir
 Devi Ahilya Bai Holkar Award to D. Shanthi, Tamil Nadu
 Jhansi Ki Rani Lakshmi Bai Award to Vanguri Suvartha, Andhra Pradesh
 Rani Gaidinliu Zeliang Award to Senu Tsuhah, Nagaland

2007 recipients 
The recipients of the 2007 Stree Shakti Puraskar were announced on 28 February 2009:

 Kannagi Award to Aruna Tara, Andhra Pradesh
 Mata Jijabai Award to V. Vijaya, Andhra Pradesh
 Devi Ahilya Bai Holkar Award to Vaishnavi Jayakumar, Tamil  Nadu
 Jhansi Ki Rani Lakshmi Bai Award to Rani Devi, Haryana
 Rani Gaidinliu Zeliang Award to Buangi Sailo, Mizoram

2008 recipients 
The recipients of the 2008 Stree Shakti Puraskar were announced on 8 March 2010 together with the 2009 recipients.

 Kannagi Award to Mahe Jabeen, Andhra Pradesh
 Devi Ahilya Bai Holkar Award to Hina Shah, Gujarat
 Jhansi Ki Rani Lakshmi Bai Award to Sunita Devi, Haryana
 Rani Gaidinliu Zeliang Award to Jhingubai Shrawan Bolake, Maharashtra

2009 recipients 
The recipients of the 2009 Stree Shakti Puraskar were announced on 8 March 2010 together with the 2008 recipients.

 Kannagi Award to Phoolbasan Bai Yadav, Chhattisgarh
 Devi Ahilya Bai Holkar Award to Rashmi Singh, Delhi
 Jhansi Ki Rani Lakshmi Bai to M. Vijaya, Karnataka
 Rani Gaidinliu Zeliang Award to Ved Kumari Ghai, Jammu & Kashmir
 Rani Rudramma Devi Award to Sugatha Kumari, Kerala

2010 recipients 
The 2010 Stree Shakti Puraskar was awarded to four women:

 Kannagi Award to Thagu Maya Bardewa from Sikkim
 Devi Ahilya Bai Holkar Award to Monika S. Garg from Uttar Pradesh
 Rani Lakshmi Bai Award to Pottabathini Padmavathi from Andhra Pradesh
 Rani Gaidinliu Zeliang Award to Rathnamma from Karnataka

2011 recipients 
The 2011 Stree Shakti Puraskar was awarded to six women:

 Kannagi Award to Kanwaljit Kaur from Chandigarh
 Mata Jijabai Award to Jagmati Malik from Haryana
 Devi Ahilya Bai Holkar Award to Hypno Padma Kamlakar from Andhra Pradesh
 Rani Lakshmi Bai Award to Sandhya Pandey from Chhattisgarh
 Rani Gaidinliu Zeliang Award to Draupadi Ghimiray from Sikkim
 Rani Rudramma Devi Award to Rakhee Gupta Bhandari from Delhi

2012 recipients 
The 2012 Stree Shakti Puraskar was awarded to five women.  In addition, the Rani Lakshmi Bai Award was posthumously dedicated to the "Spirit of Nirbhaya".

 Kannagi Award to Guramma H. Sankina from Karnataka
 Mata Jijabai Award to Sonika Agarwal from Delhi
 Devi Ahilya Bai Holkar Award to Olga D’mello of Maharashtra
 Rani Gaidinliu Zeliang Award to Omana T.K from Kerala
 Rani Rudramma Devi Award to Pranita Talukdar from Assam

2013 recipients 
The 2013 Stree Shakti Puraskar was awarded to six recipients:

 Kannagi Award to T. Radha K. Prashanti from Andhra Pradesh
 Mata Jijabai Award to Bina Sheth Lashkari from Maharashtra
 Devi Ahilya Bai Holkar Award to Seema Sakhare from Maharashtra
 Rani Lakshmi Bai Award to Manasi Pradhan from Odisha
 Rani Gaidinliu Zeliang Award to Vartika Nanda from Delhi
 Rani Rudramma Devi Award to M. Venkaiah from Andhra Pradesh

2014 recipients
For the year 2014, the Stree Shakti Puraskar was awarded to four individuals and two organizations:

 Kannagi Award to P Bhanumati of Kerala
 Mata Jijabai Award to Chandraprabha Bokey from Maharashtra
 Devi Ahilya Bai Holkar Award to Anyay Rahit Zindagi (NGO) of Goa
 Rani Lakshmi Bai Award to Seema Prakash of Madhya Pradesh
 Rani Gaidinliu Zeliang Award to Sister Mariola from Rajasthan
 Rani Rudramma Devi Award to Astha Sansthan (NGO) of Rajasthan

8 women received the Nari Shakti Puraskar, which was conferred for the first time:
 Rashmi Anand 
 Nanditha Krishna 
 Laxmi Gautam 
 Neha Kirpal 
 Latika Thukral 
 Sailakshmi Balijepally 
 P. Kausalya 
 Swaraj Vidwan

2015 recipients 
The award was given to 22 recipients: 7 institutions and 15 individuals.  The individual recipients are listed below:
 Lucy Kurien
 Saurabh Suman
 Basanti Devi
 Suparna Baksi Ganguly
 Meena Sharma
 Preeti Patkar
 Uttara Padwar
 Polumati Vijaya Nirmala
 Vasu Primlani
 Sujata Sahu (17000 ft Foundation)
 Jyoti Mhapsekar
 Sumita Ghosh
 Anjali Sharma
 Krishna Yadav
 Shakuntala Majumdar
The institutional awards for 2015 were divided into categories:
 Kannagi Award to the State of Haryana
 Devi Ahilya Bai Holkar Award to the Konoklota Mahila Urban Co-Operative Bank, Assam
 Rani Lakshmi Bai Awards to the Technology, Information, Forecasting & Assessment Council (TIFAC), Delhi and the Breakthrough Trust, Delhi
 Rani Gaidinliu Zeliang Awards to Jagori, Delhi and Guria Swayam Sevi Sansthan, Uttar Pradesh
 Rani Rudramma Devi Award to the Angadipuram Gramma Panchayat, Kerala

2016 recipients 
The award was given to 33 recipients: 6 institutions and 27 individuals.
 State of Rajasthan
 Chhanv Foundation, Delhi
 Mizo Hmeichhe Insuihkhawm Pawl (MHIP), Mizoram
 Sadhana Mahila Sangha, Karnataka
 Shikshit Rojgar Kendra Prabandhak Samiti, Rajasthan
 Tripunithura Kathakali Kendram Ladies Troupe, Kerala
 Amruta Patil, Goa
 Amala Akkineni, Telangana
 Anatta Sonney, Karnataka (Joint Award)
 Anoyara Khatun, West Bengal
 B. Codanayaguy, Puducherry (Joint Award)
 Bano Haralu, Nagaland
 Deepa Mathur, Rajasthan
 Divya Rawat, Uttarakhand
 Ilse Köhler Rollefson, Rajasthan
 Janki Vasant, Gujarat
 Kalpana Shankar, Tamil Nadu
 Kalyani Pramod Balakrishnan, Tamil Nadu
 Mumtaz M. Kazi, Maharashtra
 Nandita Shah, Tamil Nadu
 Pallavi Fauzdar, Delhi
 Pamela Malhotra, Karnataka
 Qamar Dagar, Delhi
 Reema Sathe, Maharashtra
 Ringyuichon Vashum, Manipur
 Sangita Iyer, Kerala
 Smita Tandi, Chhattisgarh
 Sumitra Hazarika, Assam
 Sunita Singh Choken, Haryana
 Subha Varier, Kerala (Joint Award)
 Tiasa Adhya, West Bengal
 V. Nanammal, Tamil Nadu
 Zuboni Hümtsoe, Nagaland

2017 recipients

39 individuals and institutions received the award.
 Gargi Gupta
 Sindhutai Sapkal
 Gauri Maulekhi
 Navika Sagar Parikrama – INSV Tarini Team – Combined Award to Lt. Cdr. Vartika Joshi, Lt. Cdr. Pratibha Jamwal, Lt. Cdr. Patarpalli Swathi, Lt. Aishwarya Bodapatti, Lt. SH Vijaya Devi and Lt. Payal Gupta.
 Dr. Malvika Iyer
 R Umadevi Nagaraj
 Thinlas Chorol
 S. Siva Sathya
 Bharti Kashyap – eye doctor
 Beti Zindabad Bakery
 Mittal Patel
 Sabarmatee Tiki
 Jayamma Bandari
 K. Syamalakumari
 Vanastree
 Lizymol Philipose Pamadykandathil
 Chirom Indira
 Urmila Balawant Apte
 Deepika Kundaji
 Purnima Barman
 Anita Bharadwaj
 Ambica Beri
 Pushpa Girimaji
 Avani (organisation)
 Shrujan
 Dr. C.K. Durga
 Rekha Mishra
 Mehvish Mushtaq
 Karuna Society for Animals and Nature
 One Stop Centre, Raipur
 Millet Network of India
 State of Punjab
 Madhu Jain
 Jetsun Pema
 M.S. Sunil
 Sheela Balaji
 Anuradha Krishnamoorthy and Namrata Sundaresan
 Justice Gita Mittal

2018 recipients 

The President of India, Ram Nath Kovind gave away the Nari Shakti Puraskar to 44 recipients, which includes 3 institutions. The award function was held on 8 March 2019. The awardees (in alphabetical order) are:

A. Seema (Scientist, Centre for Material for Electronics Technology [CMET]) – Developed low cost technology for early detection and screening of breast cancer
Anshu Khanna – Empowered women craftspersons through her project "Royal Fables"
Anu Malhotra (Filmmaker) – Transformed the lives of people through her thought provoking films
Anuradha N. Naik – Contributed in developing the skills of tribal women to cultivate and conserve local chilli variety in Goa
Chetna Gala Sinha – Founder of a bank for and by rural women
Darshana Gupta – Touched the lives of 3500 women by initiating mass marriages of those belonging to less privileged backgrounds
Devaki Amma – An environmentalist who protected biodiversity by growing rare trees on her land in Kerala
Delia Narayan Contractor (Self-taught architect) – Designed eco-friendly sustainable houses with mud and stone inspired from local traditions
Gowri Kamakashi – Instrumental contribution in uplifting lives through her philanthropic interventions in healthcare
Hekani Jakhalu Kense of YouthNet – Empowered women, unemployed and drop-out youth to develop skills and find livelihood
Ipsita Biswas (Scientist, DRDO) – Crucial contribution in performance evaluation of armour material and life-saving devices like bullet-proof jackets for our armed and paramilitary forces
Iti Tyagi – Contributed in conserving crafts culture by setting up a platform wherein artisans get a chance to connect with consumers, industry and patrons. The platform offers learning and sharing
Kagganapalli Radha Devi – Instrumental in breaking traditional notions of gender and employing many female barbers in Tirupathi temple to tonsure the hair of women devotees.
Kalpana Saroj – Revives a shut-down industrial unit. Provided employment to poor masses and women. Born in an underprivileged family, she is now a globally recognised business woman.
Lalita Vakil – Chamba Rumal
Madhuri Barthwal – First Garhwali female musician; dedicated her life towards folk music and its preservation
Manju Manikuttan – A committed social worker, she has helped numerous Indian wo in Saudi Arabia who migrate for work and face foreign land issues
Meenakshi Pahuja – An International level swimmer, She has played an instrumental role in the lives of young women and students with different abilities keeping an interest in swimming
Mini Vasudevan – A passionate animal activist who has sensitised the public and relentlessly worked on various aspects of animal welfare and environmental sustainability
Munuswamy Shanthi (Scientist, Satish Dhwan Space Center)
Neelum Sharma – A senior correspondent at DD News & a filmmaker. Her strong advocacy of the marginalised section is reflected in several documentaries directed by her
Nomita Kamdar – An entrepreneur who has played a key role in bringing public awareness about environmental issues through adventure sports and eco-tourism, thereby restoring the natural harmony in the Western Ghats
Pamela Chatterjee – She has dedicated her life to the restoration of barren lands, uncultivable sodic soils and water conservation projects. She has supported numerous farmers through her work
Pragya Prasun – An activist and social worker who survived an acid attack and now provides relief and rehabilitation to such survivors to enable them to thrive in life
Priyamvada Singh – An entrepreneur who has created employment opportunities for villagers by restoring her 148 year old ancestral fort and developing it as a community-run home stay
Pushpa Preeya – An exam scribe who has been writing exams for specially-enabled persons from the past 10 years and aims to contribute in their lives and careers
Rahibai Soma Popere – Fondly known as "Seed Mother", she has conserved native seeds of several crops and prevented the exploitation of distressed farmers in Maharashtra
Rajani Rajak – Iconic folk singer of Dhola Maru art form of Chhattisgarh, she has relentlessly worked to keep this art form alive through her performances
Reshma Nilofer Naha – The first woman marine pilot in India
Rhea Mazumdar Singhal – An entrepreneur building a sustainable environment by using agri-waste to make biodegradable food packaging
Ruma Devi – Herself an artisan, she has empowered craftspersons by forming self-help groups, eliminating the middleman and bringing better profits to them. She works with over 11000 artisans as of now
Seema Kaushik Mehta – A Kathak artiste who is inspiring the next generation of artists by teaching them Kathak
Seema Rao – First and only woman commando trainer in India. She has trained over 15000 soldiers from Indian Army, Navy, Air, Paramilitary Police, NSG, ITBP, SVP, NPA Commando Wing SFF & Para Special Forces free of cost. She, along with her husband invented an indigenous method of reflex shooting, which is known as the Rao System of Reflex Fire which has benefited the Indian Army.
Sister Shivani (Motivational speaker and teacher) – Her seminars and television programmes on human behaviour have transformed the millions of lives
Smriti Morarka – Initiated "Tantuvi" to revive the weaving traditions of Benaras. She provides a platform to the young generation to take up weaving
Snehlata Nath (Founder of Keystone Foundation) She has dedicated 26 years of her life to creating a harmonious balance between nature, humans and technology
Sonia Jabbar (Tea planter & wildlife conservationist) – She founded the Haathi Saathi Nature Club for children and also established an elephant friendly tea estate
Sujatha Mohan – She has spread awareness of the importance of eye donation, and provided essential eyecare services to the rural and poor population in Chennai
Sunita Devi – Working on the issue of women's health and sanitation, she is a Rani Mistri (Master Trainer) under the Swacch Bharat Mission
Twinkle Kalia – Provides free ambulance service for the needy in New Delhi
Urmi Basu – By forming the "New Light" organisation, she has been instrumental in changing lives of the children of sex workers in Kolkata's red-light area
One Stop Centre, Lucknow (Institutional Awardee)
Qasab-Kutch Craftswomen Producer Co. Ltd. (Institutional Awardee)
The Social Welfare and Nutritional Meal Programme Department, Tamil Nadu (Institutional Awardee)

2019 recipients 
The President of India, Ram Nath Kovind gave away the Nari Shakti Puraskar to fifteen women achievers. The award function was held on 9 March 2020. List of the awardees:
 Padala Bhudevi from Srikakulam, Andhra Pradesh,
 Bina Devi from Munger, Bihar,
 Arifa Jan from Srinagar, Jammu and Kashmir,
 Chami Murmu from Rajnagar, Jharkhand,
 Nilza Wangmo from Leh in Ladakh,
 Rashmi Urdhwareshe from Pune, Maharashtra,
 Sardarni Mann Kaur from Patiala, Punjab,
 Kalavati Devi from Kanpur, Uttar Pradesh,
 Tashi Malik and Nungshi Malik from Dehradun, Uttarakhand,
 Kaushiki Chakroborty from Kolkata, West Bengal,
 Karthyayani Amma and Bhageerathi Amma from Kerala,
 Avani Chaturvedi  from Rewa, Madhya Pradesh,
 Bhawana Kanth from  Darbhanga, Bihar,
 Mohana Singh from Agra, Uttar Pradesh, from Indian Air Force.

2020 recipients 

Awards given 8 March 2022.

 Anita Gupta
 Ushaben Dineshbhai Vasava
 Nasira Akhter
 Sandhya Dhar
 Nivruti Rai
 Tiffany Brar
 Padma Yangchan
 Jodhaiya Bai Baiga
 Saylee Nandkishor Agavane
 Vanita Jagdeo Borade
 Meera Thakur
 Jaya Muthu, Tejamma  (joint)
 Ela Lodh
 Arti Rana

2021 recipients 

Awards given 8 March 2022.

 Sathupati Prasanna Sree
 Tage Rita Takhe
 Madhulika Ramteke
 Niranjanaben Mukulbhai Kalarthi
 Pooja Sharma
 Anshul Malhotra
 Shobha Gasti
 Radhika Menon
 Kamal Kumbhar
 Sruti Mohapatra
 Batool Begam
 Thara Rangaswamy
 Neerja Madhav
 Neena Gupta

See also
 List of awards for contributions to society
 List of awards honoring women

Notes and references

External links

Women in India
Orders, decorations, and medals for women
Civil awards and decorations of India
Awards for contributions to society
1999 establishments in Delhi
Awards established in 1999
Indian awards
Awards honoring women